The 1977 NASCAR Grand National Winston Cup Series was the 29th season of professional stock car racing in the United States and the 6th modern era NASCAR Cup series. The season began on Sunday, January 16 and ended on Sunday, November 20. Cale Yarborough driving the Junior Johnson #11 Holly Farms Chevrolet won his second consecutive NASCAR Grand National Series Winston Cup Championship. Ricky Rudd was crowned NASCAR Rookie of the Year.

This was the last season without Terry Labonte until 2015; the team he would join was in 1977 driven by Skip Manning.

Season recap

Donnie Allison is credited with the win but Darrell Waltrip finished the race for an over-heated Donnie Allison after Darrell Waltrip dropped out of the race after 106 laps. Points are always scored by the driver, who starts the race.

Race Summaries

Winston Western 500 - David Pearson pounced when Cale Yarborough spun and seized his eleventh race in his last 23 starts, and fourth straight win on a California speedway.
Daytona 500 - Cale Yarborough became only the second driver to win the Daytona 500 more than once, edging Benny Parsons.  Richard Petty nearly lost a lap on the start due to an emergency stop on the pace lap; Bobby Wawak's car caught fire on Lap Four and the yellow allowed Petty to get a lap back; he roared through the field and led but fell out with engine failure, his eleventh engine-related failure in the last 37 races. 
Richmond 400 - Yarborough led 161 laps as rain cut the event short at 245 laps; it was Cale's twelfth win in the last 37 races.
Carolina 500 - North Carolina Motor Speedway was repaved in the off-season and the surface proved slick; the lead changed 30 times amid numerous crashes.  Richard Petty pounced after halfway and won handily for the first superspeedway race to finish with an average speed under 100 MPH since 1961.
Atlanta 500 - Petty, Pearson, and Cale had the entire race to themselves and finished 1-2-3 as only two cautions interrupted the 500-miler.
Gwyn Staley 400 - Yarborough led 320 laps en route to the win.  Neil Bonnett won his second pole of the season in Harry Hyde's Dodge.
Rebel 500 - Darrell Waltrip first served notice for the season as a two-car crash with six laps to go brought out the yellow; Waltrip surged as Bobby Allison (subbing for his brother Donnie in Hoss Ellington's Chevy) and Petty were racing to the line; all three hit the line abreast and Waltrip was declared the winner by inches as the race ended under yellow.
Southeastern 500 - Yarborough annihilated the field at Bristol International Raceway as he led all but five laps and was seven laps ahead of runner-up Dick Brooks, this thanks in part to only two brief yellows.
Virginia 500 - Darrell Waltrip led 51 laps in challenging Cale and also Benny Parsons but fell out with brake failure.  Parsons led 83 laps but was no match for Cale; the win was Yarborough's fifth of the season and 15th of the last 43 races.
Winston 500 - The race lead changed 63 times among 11 drivers as Donnie Allison led over 70 laps.  Richard Petty exploded from ninth to the lead on Lap Six but fell out on Lap 153 with engine failure.   On the final lap Darrell Waltrip led with Allison second, Cale Yarborough third, and Benny Parsons fourth; Waltrip swung low in Turn Two to break the draft, and a mad scramble ensued where Cale rocketed to the high side in Three but was sideswiped by Waltrip and Parsons tried to shoot the gap; Cale edged Parsons for second as Waltrip broke away to the win.
Music City 420 - Benny Parsons ended Yarborough's streak of short track wins when he grabbed the lead with 38 laps to go after Cale had led 275 straight laps; it was the first win for Parsons in the season.
Mason Dixon 500 - For the second straight Dover race Cale Yarborough lost multiple laps, this time getting his damaged rear bumper repaired; Junior Johnson tore it off by hand and sent Cale back out; Cale erased his deficit and after a lap-after-lap battle with David Pearson broke away to the win, his sixth of the season, increasing his point lead to 202 over third-place finisher Richard Petty.
World 600 - Before Petty Enterprises left for the Charlotte Motor Speedway engine builder Maurice Petty created a race motor that had the same horsepower as their qualifying motor; Richard unleashed that horsepower leading 311 laps and winning by over half a lap; he broke away from early battles with Pearson and Donnie Allison and past halfway executed a risky three-abreast pass in the trioval around Pearson and Bobby Allison driving Benny Parsons' Chevrolet in relief with Coo Coo Marlin's lapped car involved.   Cale Yarborough broke a water pump and lost 50 laps getting repairs; his point lead was thus sliced nearly in half, to 108 points.
NAPA 400 - Petty broke away from the field for the final 63 laps and beat Pearson and Cale for his fourth win of the year; Petty and Pearson finished together in the top two for the 63rd and what turned out to be final time.
Michigan 400 - Cale Yarborough got back on track with a dominant win at Michigan International Speedway, his first there since 1970.  He was critical of the track's surface, which had buckled in spots due to a hard winter: "My car jumped out of gear three times."
Firecracker 400 - Neil Bonnett won the pole after his team wrenched by Harry Hyde was purchased by mysterious coal-miner J.D. Stacy; the former K&K Insurance #71 was renumbered and painted white with red lettering; a cylinder faltered on the start and Bonnett limped home eighth.  After Cale and Bobby Allison fought for the lead in the first 49 laps with A. J. Foyt and Darrell Waltrip (the lead changed 28 times in that span) Richard Petty took over, leading 92 of the last 111 laps.  "I wish people would stop complaining about the Chevrolets," said Waltrip (second at the end).  "A Dodge won the pole here and Petty's Dodge blew my doors off."  Cale's transmission broke and after replacing the transmission he finished 14 laps down in 23rd, saying, "When Old Blue (Petty) wanted to go, he went."  Petty cut Cale's point lead to 17.
Nashville 420 - Darrell Waltrip led the last 251 laps for an easy win, but scoring headaches (due to pit road being the track's infield quarter-mile oval) left second and third place in dispute; Bobby Allison finished a lap down in second and Richard Petty finished third.
Coca-Cola 500 - NASCAR mandated cylinder changes for Ford engines that gave them some 20 extra horsepower, though David Pearson believed "we need 40" to battle the Chevrolets. The race lead changed hands 47 times officially as Benny Parsons flexed the most muscle he'd shown in the season to that point.  Darrell Waltrip won the pole, his first on a superspeedway, and photos from this Pocono race were used in an October story on Waltrip in Sports Illustrated.  Richard Petty rallied from a flat tire in the first twenty laps; he closed on Parsons  in the final laps but finished a close second.  Parsons led 118 laps for his second win of the year, while Cale Yarborough finished sixth with damage from a crash with Buddy Baker at lap 120; Petty thus took the point lead by eight points over Cale and Junior Johnson stated the car simply wasn't strong enough.  
Talladega 500 - Once again Alabama International Motor Speedway witnessed one of the most bizarre weekends in NASCAR history.  Following qualifying (Benny Parsons and Donnie Allison swept the front row while Chevrolets swept the top ten; Petty's Dodge in 11th was best of the non-Chevrolets) NASCAR confiscated the fuel cell (a Banjo Matthews product that was expandable) of one of the race's entrants (the identity of the team was not revealed) and Bill Gazaway announced he was cracking down on illegal fuel cells following this plus several bouts of unusually good mileage at Pocono; he stationed an official near the garage pay phones and the names of crewmen frantically telephoning to order new fuel cells were taken down.  Thus were Junior Johnson, Hoss Ellington, Bud Moore, M.C. Anderson, and DiGard Racing caught with illegal fuel cells and fined.   Donnie Allison fought for the lead as it changed 49 times on a brutally hot day; he fell ill after drinking a bottle of soda and needed a relief driver; Darrell Waltrip arrived in the Hoss Ellington pit and drove the final 40 laps, beating Cale Yarborough and Skip Manning for the win, the final time entering the 2021 season a relief driver got the win.  Cale was second despite complaining afterward that his car was stuck in fourth gear and was "the sorriest Chevrolet on the track"; with Petty finishing 11th with a burned valve, Cale retook the point lead and would never look back.
Champion Spark Plug 400 - Moved to Monday following Sunday rains, the 400-miler at Michigan International Speedway was won by Darrell Waltrip.  It was the first Grand National race run following the passing of 1970 champion Bobby Isaac.
Volunteer 500 - Yarborough grabbed his eighth win of the season, edging Darrell Waltrip under caution.
Southern 500 - The surging seasons of Yarborough and Waltrip collided hard in the Southern 500.  Waltrip won the pole and Cale started fourth, and the two battled hard for first; the lead had changed hands 28 times by Lap 236 when the leaders came into lapped traffic; Waltrip slammed into Yarborough and the wreck wiped out Janet Guthrie, D.K. Ulrich, and Terry Bivins.  Waltrip limped home sixth and Yarborugh salvaged fourth as David Pearson pounced to the win, only his second of the season.  Following the race Ulrich confronted Yarborough about the wreck, and Cale responded, "I didn't hit you, Jaws did.   Jaws Waltrip."  Ulrich started laughing upon recognizing the reference and it became a catchphrase for fans about Waltrip.
Capital City 400 - Dodge Chargers finished 1-2 as Neil Bonnett, heavily coached by crew chief Harry Hyde, edged Richard Petty for his first Grand National win and the first for team owner J.D. Stacy.
Delaware 500 - Benny Parsons and Donnie Allison combined to lead 470 of 500 laps as Parsons grabbed his third win of the season and Donnie finished fourth.  Neil Bonnett, fresh off his first career win, won the pole and led 20 laps.  Cale Yarborough finished third and added 77 points to his lead as Richard Petty fell out with engine failure.
Old Dominion 500 - Yarborough grabbed his ninth win of the season on a very hot day, so hot an exhausted Yarborough called for the track to shorten the distance of its races, which earned an angry rebuke from H. Clay Earles.
Wilkes 400 - Richard Petty's fading title hopes took another blow at North Wilkesboro Speedway.  Petty led 199 laps from the pole but crashed after being sideswiped by the lapped car of Bobby Allison.  Darrell Waltrip took the win and in postrace interviews said the race was easy according to what he called "The Cale Scale," a mocking reference to Yarborough's complaint about fatigue the week earlier.
National 500 - Benny Parsons authored his most dominant run of the season as he led 250 laps and wasn't slowed despite running out of gas and losing a lap; he easily rebounded and ran down Yarborough for the win.  Richard Petty led 25 laps but the suspension collapsed while leading; Petty's Dodge slowed off Four and David Pearson and Bobby Allison spun behind him.  The DNF effectively ended Petty's title hopes.  Dave Marcis finished 23rd in Penske Racing's Chevrolet, and following the race the Chevy equipment was sold to businessman Rod Osterlund and Marcis was tabbed as the new team's driver.
American 500 - Donnie Allison dominated the weekend for his second win of the year and ninth career Winston Cup Grand National win.  Cale Yarborough clinched the championship despite a runner-up finish by Petty.   Darrell Waltrip raced despite incurring injuries at Riverside International Raceway and also after being kicked by a mule during a parade days before the race.  "I ran into a wall and got stepped on by a mule," Waltrip said afterward.
Dixie 500 - Rain delayed the race to the doorstep of darkness and cut its distance to 268 laps.   On the final lap with darkness close to enveloping the track, Darrell Waltrip, using the lapped car of James Hylton as a pick, stormed past Donnie Allison and stole the win; Donnie crashed with Cale Yarborough at the stripe, finishing fourth.
Los Angeles Times 500 - 1974 Dodge Chargers swept the front row and Petty and Neil Bonnett battled for the lead all 500 miles; the lead changed 37 official times and numerous additional times, particularly in the opening laps as Petty and Bonnett battled Pearson, A. J. Foyt, and Waltrip.  Waltrip fell out and Pearson lost a lap late as Petty came up short of Bonnett at the stripe despite skidding through Turn Four to try to catch him.  The win was Bonnett's first on a superspeedway and the 45th Winston Cup Grand National win for crew chief Harry Hyde.  Cale Yarborough recovered from a late spin to finish third; his winning point total was 5,000, the highest point total recorded under the point system developed by Bob Latford.  Dave Marcis finished 14th in his first race with Rod Osterlund. For 5 laps under caution Janet Guthrie led laps which was the first time a woman led laps in NASCAR, and would not be done by a woman in the NASCAR Monster Energy Cup Series until the 2013 Daytona 500 when Danica Patrick would lead laps.

Full Drivers’ Championship

(key) Bold – Pole position awarded by time. Italics – Pole position set by owner's points. * – Most laps led.

References

External links
 Winston Cup Standings and Statistics for 1977

 

NASCAR Cup Series seasons